Ministry of Economy, Labour and Social Policy is a Polish abolished government administration office serving the minister in charge of  economy, labor, regional development, tourism, social security.

The Ministry was established by the decree of the Council of Ministers of 7 January 2003. It was abolished on 2 May 2004, and the organizational units were incorporated into the new Ministry of Economy and Labour. The only minister was Jerzy Hausner (SLD).

External links
 Official government website of Poland

References

 
 
Poland,2003
2003 establishments in Poland